The 1966–67 season was the 83rd football season in which Dumbarton competed at a Scottish national level, entering the Scottish Football League, the Scottish Cup and the Scottish League Cup.  In addition Dumbarton competed in the Stirlingshire Cup.

Scottish Second Division

This was to be an uninspiring league season from the start, with only two wins achieved by December, and which ultimately saw Dumbarton finish in 14th place, with 33 points, a massive 36 behind champions Morton.

Scottish League Cup

In the League Cup, there was little to cheer with only a single win and a draw from the six sectional matches which meant no further progress in the competition.

Scottish Cup

In the Scottish Cup, after a win over local rivals Clydebank in the second preliminary round, Dumbarton fell to Division 1 opponents Partick Thistle in the first round proper.

Stirlingshire Cup
Dumbarton's bad luck in the Stirlingshire Cup continued to 'dog' them. A first round draw against Stirling Albion was decided by the toss of a coin - which Dumbarton lost - the second such loss in successive seasons.

Friendlies

Player statistics

Squad 

|}

Source:

Transfers
Amongst those players joining and leaving the club were the following:

Players in

Players out 

Source:

References

Dumbarton F.C. seasons
Scottish football clubs 1966–67 season